Gulf Branch is a stream in Arlington County, Virginia. From its source southwest of the Gulf Branch Nature Center, Gulf Branch flows on a northeastern course and empties into the Potomac River within the Federal parklands of the George Washington Memorial Parkway.  Gulf Branch is surrounded predominantly by forests.

Parks
Gulf Branch Natural Area, Arlington County Parks and Recreation
George Washington Memorial Parkway, US National Park Service

Attractions
Gulf Branch Forge
Robert Walker Log House
Gulf Branch Pond
Molly Ross Rising Relics, outdoor art display
Gulf Branch Nature Center, features exhibits on local wildlife and local Native American history
Potomac River Trail, parallel with the stream, begins across from the Gulf Branch Nature Center
Potomac Palisades, includes a 30-foot drop in the stream just prior to its confluence with the Potomac
Potomac Heritage Trail, perpendicular to the stream, crosses between the Palisades and the Potomac
Gulf Branch Bouldering Area

Roadway crossings
Military Road
George Washington Memorial Parkway

Rock Climbing
A small climbing area with roughly 15 climbs is located at the mouth of the stream, where Gulf Branch feeds into the Potomac, near the Potomac Palisades

See also
List of rivers of Virginia

Rivers of Virginia
Tributaries of the Potomac River
Rivers of Arlington County, Virginia